Snow Hill Covered Bridge, also known as Johnson Fork Covered Bridge, is a historic Howe Truss covered bridge located in Whitewater Township, Franklin County, Indiana.  The bridge was built in 1895, and measures 75 feet long.  It has a gable roof, is clad in board and natten siding, and has an open clerestory.

It was listed on the National Register of Historic Places in 1995.

References

Covered bridges on the National Register of Historic Places in Indiana
Bridges completed in 1895
Transportation buildings and structures in Franklin County, Indiana
National Register of Historic Places in Franklin County, Indiana
Road bridges on the National Register of Historic Places in Indiana
Wooden bridges in Indiana
Howe truss bridges in the United States